Goaso is a city and the capital of the newly created Ahafo Region of Ghana. Goaso doubles as the capital of Asunafo North Municipal District.
It is located between three major towns; Mim, Kukuom and Hwidiem.
Other surrounding towns include Ayumso, Akrodie, Fawohoyeden and Nkaseim.
Goaso had a 2017 estimated population of 24,846 making it the 2nd largest town after Mim in the Asunafo North Municipal District.
Goaso is home to the offices of certain government agencies and institutions.

History
Goaso sits on the bank of River 'Goa.' So the Twi word 'Goa-so' means 'bank of river Goa.'
According to oral histories, the first chief of Goaso was a palm wine tapper. And occasionally, he sent palm wine to the Asantehene who is the absolute monarch of the Asante people.

Economy
Agriculture: Goaso has a very rich vegetation cover. It is one of the food baskets of Ghana. The forest cover of the area is very thick and supports farming activities. The predominant occupation of the residents is farming, which is both Cocoa farming and cultivation of food crops. 
Food production in Goaso is very high as compared to other parts of the country which led the NPP government to launch one of its flagship programs "the Planting for Food and Jobs" in this town.

Trading: Goaso is noted for commercial and business activities. 
Retailing and other trading activities pick up on Wednesdays which is the weekly market day. Trading is particularly high in Goaso during the main-cocoa seasons.
On every Wednesday, people from near and far come to Goaso to transact businesses. Farmers from other Districts also send their food crops to the Goaso Wednesday market to meet buyers who come from as far as Accra and Tema.
There are no manufacturing companies in Goaso. However, the light industrial area of this town is populated with several artisanal works. Artisans which predominate are the auto mechanics.

Tourism & Festival
The shrine at Goaso krodadaamu is considered a potential tourist site.
The main festival cerebrated by the chiefs and people of Goaso is the Abetiase Festival. 
'Abetiase' is a Twi word meaning 'Palm tree never dies'. This festival is cerebrated to mark the important role which the first Chief of Goaso played in sending palm wine to the Asantehene during special occasions.
Abetiase festival is a bi-annual event and many people from far and near join in the cerebration which is held in the month of August.

Education
There are several educational institutions in Goaso. Notable amongst them are the Goaso Nursing and Midwifery Training College and Ahafoman Senior High and Technical School.
There are however, other private vocational institutes in Goaso.

References

Populated places in the Ahafo Region
Regional capitals in Ghana